The Eparchy of Alqosh is the Chaldaean rite eparchy in Iraq, that was established in 1960.

The bishop is dependent to the Patriarch of Babylon.

Eparchial bishops
Bishops and archbishops of the Eparchy and their terms of service:

Abdul-Ahad Sana (1961–2001)
Mikha Pola Maqdassi (2001–present)
Coadjutor Thabet Habib Yousif Al Mekko (2021–present)

External links
GCatholic.org                   
Catholic Hierarchy.org entry 

Chaldean Catholic dioceses
Assyrian geography